is a Japanese pop singer, she was a former bassist and vocalist for the all-female pop rock band Zone. She is also a former 
the lead singer and one of two bassists for the pop/rock band Maria.

Biography 
Maiko sang solo on two songs for Zone: "Sae Zuri (Bird Chirping)" and "Like". She also wrote the lyrics for "Chiisa na Uta (Little Song)", Maria's first single, and also wrote the lyrics for the "Sora (Sky)".

1986 births
Living people
People from Suita
Japanese women pop singers
Musicians from Sapporo
21st-century Japanese singers
21st-century Japanese women singers